Street art has existed in Ponce, Puerto Rico, since at least the mid twentieth century. It received a boost from the Ponce municipal authorities in 2017 with the creation of the public-private partnership Ponce es Ley. Since then over four dozen works of art dot the city and, increasingly, the municipality. Street artists have prominently created murals in the Ponce Historic Zone as well as its adjacent areas and barrios.

One of the objectives of the Ponce es Ley urban festival event was “to create a ‘street museum’, where people wouldn't have to enter a hall to view works of art,” 
while also beautifying abandoned or unused buildings in Ponce’s historical streets. It has been said that there is street art in Ponce because ”street art is wed to the big cities, and that is Ponce[, a big city]”  The city's street art has been termed “a street museum.” It envisioned a city as a destination for art lovers.

Another notable street art project took place in January 2018 at Callejón Trujillo and termed "Murales para Pensar" (Murals to Make You Think). Unlike the Ponce es Ley murals, which portrayed Ponce history, and cultural, musical and architectural themes, Murales para Pensar portrays political, social and economic themes.

History

Street art existed in Ponce even prior to 1960 when the now non-existent mural “La Abnegación” (Selflessness) was unveiled by Rafael Ríos Rey, Puerto Rico's first street muralist, at the location now (2020) occupied by the Instituto de Musica Juan Morel Campos. Rafael Ríos Rey's mosaic street art at La Abnegación was lost to the perils of over 50 years of Ponce weather and by 2016 a Puerto Rico PIP representative Denis Márquez Lebrón to present a bill in the Puerto Rico legislature to investigate its disrepair.

By early 2016 the Museo "Museo Abierto Playa Ponce" (Ponce Playa Open Museum) had also been created, exhibiting dozens or murals.

Ponce es Ley
In 2017, the Ponce es Ley idea materialized. The idea for the Ponce es Ley “festival of urban art” display came from Alexis Bousquet Rodríguez, (aka, Clandestino 797) an artist from Santurce, who started the concept in the San Juan neighborhood of Santurce. The success of the effort there motivated him to expand it to the other towns in Puerto Rico.  His goal was a produce a network of street art that would cover all of Puerto Rico. His goal was to create an art network around Puerto Rico. The first town to embrace and implement the idea was the offshore island-municipality of Culebra. Once completed, Bousquet Rodríguez met with the Ponce municipal authorities from whence Ponce became the artists' next stop.

The project was co-chaired by the Museo de Arte de Ponce, while Ponce municipal government established the range of themes to be included in the murals. The theme of the displays had to be consistent with the history, culture, music and architecture of the city of Ponce.  The kickoff event for the Ponce es Ley project took place on 8 April 2017. Twenty-two local, regional and international artists participated.

Images and mapped locations of over 50 works of Ponce street art are increasingly available in Google Maps. Hotspots for viewing Ponce es Ley street art include: Plaza Las Delicias and Paseo Amor. Sites for the murals include: the Puerto Rico Lottery building on Calle Union facing Plaza Degetau; the unoccupied building at the northwest corner of Calle Sol and Calle Mayor; the Instituto de Musica Juan Morel Campos at the southeast corner of Calle Cristina and Calle Mayor; the parking lot of Centro Islamico de Ponce on Calle Luna, near Calle Mayor; and Paseo Amor, located on the east end of Plaza Degetau.

Themes include Ponce culture, including vejigantes, homage to prominent people from Ponce, city life, family memories and folklore, Ponce countryside and agriculture.

Artists and their work
 Jean Ortiz Ortiz is original from the barrio Bélgica community. Ortiz worked on “Estefanía Rodríguez, the poet” at the location of the former “La Abnegación” by Rafael Rios Rey
 Juan Ramón Gutierrez Rovira (aka, The Stencil Network), from Puerto Rico, painted a mural inspired on propaganda (C. Luna, next to the Ponce Islamic Center)  
 David Sepúlveda (aka, Don Rmx), created the vejigante, on the northwest corner of C. Sol and C. Mayor, and the first mural of the Ponce es Ley event to be completed. He is from Puerto Rico.
 Sarah Emma Urbain Rodríguez, (Don Senario) also from Puerto Rico.
 Ess Urbain, creator of mural at Hotel Melia parking lot's east wall.
 José Luis Gutiérrez. Original from Puerto Rico.
 Nelson Figueroa Also from Puerto Rico.
 Bordalo II (Bordalo Segundo) creator of “Manati” at the abandoned gas station on the southwest corner of C. Villa and C. Mendez Vigo. He hails from Portugal.
 Decertor, who hails from Perú.
 Bik Ismo – author of the Ponce es Ley mural on the exterior of Museo de Arte de Ponce, by the Museum's Jardín Puerto Rico (Puerto Rico Garden).
David Zayas
 Rafael Enrique Vega Feliciano
Javier "Javi" Cintrón, creator of “Sangre y Resistencia en Ponce”, located on Paseo Amor, dedicated to the heroes of the "El Polvorin" fire.
 L.A.P. (Luis Alberto Pérez).
 Andrés Cortés creator of “Bandera del Puerto Rico Ponceño”. At 14 years old, he was the youngest of the muralists.
 Damaris Cruz.
 Miguel Conesa Osuna, created the mural at the Museo de la Historia de Ponce, Plaza Ernesto Ramos Antonini, seen from Calle Isabel heading west.
 Sheez Nicole, artist of the character “Uvita”. 
 FISU, created a mural at Ponce Servicios
 José Vega, mural on Calle Cristina, on wall to former La Democracia, across from the Hotel Melia parking lot
 Josué Pellot, created the "Nothing is True" mural on Calle Torre and Calle Villa (northeast corner).
 Patrice Lladó.
 Betsy Casanas, created "Agua de rio", a scene based on a photograph from her father milking a cow. Original from Philadelphia, Pennsylvania.
 Jesús Ortiz Torres, creator of Hechos in Callejón Comercio (Trujillo).

Murales para Pensar
Murals not related to the Ponce es Ley event started popping up at different locations of the city.  The most extensive of these is perhaps on Callejón Trujillo, sometimes also called Callejón Comercio. The murals at Callejón Trujillo are known as "Murales para Pensar" (Murals to Make You Think). Here, José Balay, Edwin Caquías, Miguel Conesa, Antonio Martorell, Ludwig Medina, Paola Olivieri, Jean Ortiz, Duque, Liu A. Pang Feliciano, Emérita Feliciano Vélez, Jorge Romero, Jorge Antonio Romero, Wilfredo Santiago Rosado, Julio César Torres, Wichie Torres, Patrick Urbain, and other muralists (25 to be exact) created their projects. The mural was spearheaded by street art muralist Jesus Ortiz Torres. Ortiz Torres named his mural Hechos (Facts).

Murales para Pensar openly criticizes then Governor Pedro Rosselló, the Junta de Control Fiscal, and U.S. President Donald Trump. For example, one of the murals at Murales Para Pensar depicts the December 2017 visit by President Donald Trump during which he made light of the suffering of Puerto Ricans resulting from the weeks' old, September 2017, Hurricane Maria. The mural depicts the moment when the president threw packs of paper towel supplies at people in the group, a group that consisted of selected political sympathizers in Guaynabo, a town located at a few minutes' drive from the president's arriving airport. Murales Para Pensar also reflect the massive migration of Puerto Ricas in recent years, and the thousands killed by the passing of Hurricane Maria but which were not initially accounted for by the Puerto Rico nor the United States governments. Unlike Ponce es Ley, Murales para Pensar openly addresses political, social and economic issues.

The street artists that participated at Murales para Pensar included José Balay, Edwin Caquías, Miguel Conesa, Juan Luis Cornier Torres (Manwe Uno), Luis Ferdinand, Alí García, Tato González, Violeta Guzmán, Dany Lugo, Antonio Martorell, Ludwig Medina, Paola Olivieri, Jean Ortiz, Duque, Liu A. Pang Feliciano, Emérita Feliciano Vélez, Jorge Romero, Jorge Antonio Romero, Wilfredo Santiago Rosado, Julio César Torres, Wichie Torres, Patrick Urbain, Rafael Enrique Vega Feliciano, and Jesús Ortiz Torres. Several of these artists had participated in the Ponce es Ley festival the year before, while the majority had not.

Other murals
There are also murals in a number of barrios not within the downtown area of the city, including Barrio Sexto (Cantera), Barrio Playa, and Barrio Tibes. There are numerous murals in Barrio Playa at Calle Salmón and Callejón Ramon Velez and a very extensive set of murals (over 20) with scenes typical of Barrio Playa on La Playa's Avenida Los Meros titled "Museo Abierto Playa Ponce" (Ponce Playa Open Museum).

Gallery

See also
 List of tourist attractions in Ponce, Puerto Rico
 Urban art
 Public art

Notes

References

External links

 Plaza Cacique Agüeybaná el bravo e Instituto de Música Juan Morel Campos (3D of Mural “La Abnegacion” (Selflessness) at the former Firehouse on the southeast corner of C. Cristina and C. Mayor)
 Mural para pensar: denuncia y autogestión (Murales at Callejon Trujillo)
 Ponce es Ley: arte urbano para transformar a la ciudad
 Llega "Ponce es ley"
 “Ponce es Ley” transforma los exteriores de la Ciudad Señorial
 Fotogalería: Los murales de Ponce es ley
 Ponce en Ley; Arte urbano; Cierre: abril 9; MAP
 Joven se distingue con su arte en “Ponce es Ley”
 Arranca el proyecto de arte urbano “Ponce es Ley”
 Emerge el Arte Urbano en el evento Ponce es Ley
 Celebrarán "Ponce es Ley"
 Ponce es Ley: Arte Urbano en el sur
 Street Art Tour of Ponce
 Ponce es Ley: una reseña contumaz
 “Ponce es Ley”
 Ponce Es Ley 2017 Scavenger Hunt by 360° Couple
 Jesús Ortiz estrena caricatura mural en Ponce

Puerto Rican culture
Museums in Ponce, Puerto Rico
Tourist attractions in Ponce, Puerto Rico
Painters from Ponce
Public art
Street art
Public art in Puerto Rico